Desfina is a town and a former municipality in the southern part of Phocis, Greece. Since the 2011 local government reform it is part of the municipality Delphi, of which it is a municipal unit. The municipal unit has an area of 148.992 km2. At the 2011 census, its population was 1,988. It is situated on a plateau at 680m elevation, 5 km from the Corinthian Gulf. It is 7 km southeast of Delphi, 9 km east of Itea and 30 km west of Livadeia.

History
Ruins near Desfina have been identified as those of the ancient towns Echedameia and Medeon (Μεδεών). Both towns were destroyed by King Philip II of Macedon around 355-346 BC during the Third Sacred War and were never rebuilt. 4 km to the east, the Late Mycenaean ruins of Kastrouli have been equated with Homeric Anemoreia (Ἀνεμώρεια).

One of the most important rebels of the Greek revolution, Bishop Isaias of Salona, fought for the liberation of Desfina until his execution by the Turks on 22 April 1821 and encouraged Athanasios Diakos for the battle of Alamana. Also, Isaias gave the signal for the beginning of revolution of Central Greece at the region of Prophet Daniel. His residence is found in Desfina and has been converted to a museum. In Desfina there is the Monastery of Honest Precursor which was distinguished at the revolution on 1821 as well as the very important Byzantine monument, the temple of Brigadiers near to the church of Saint Haralampos that dates to the 12th century.

Economy
A large employer in the area of Desfina is Aluminium of Greece, which has a production facility at nearby Distomo. Before, the locals were mainly sustained by animal breeding. The most important traditional products in the region are bakery products, olives and oil, grapes and wine, meat, cheese products and honey.

Climate

Customs, traditions and feasts
The Christmas and the Easter are celebrated with particular way mainly in villages and small town. Desfina is a town where the customs, the traditions and the feasts are still kept to a large extent. The most important festivities take place in August. The most important event is the feast of the Dormition of the Virgin Mary, which is celebrated on 15 August.

Landmarks

There are several historical monuments and temples in Desfina as well as the central square which dates back to the 19th century. The square of Desfina is encircled by traditional cafes and taverns which offer a view of Mount Parnassos.

New Abbey of Honest Precursor
Old Abbey of Honest Precursor
Temple of the Taxiarches
Temple of Brigadiers Metropolitan Temple of Virgin Mary
Temple of Saint Charalampos
Temple of Saint Dimitrios
Temple of the Holy Unmercenaries
Residence of Bishop Isaias
Residence of Spyros Papaloukas

Population

Events and organizations

The Cultural Association of Desfina I Proodos ("The Progress") was founded on 6 July 1979 and today numbers 200 members. The aim of the cultural association is the intellectual growth and moral culture, the promotion of spirit of culture and humanitarian bond between the members as well as contribution in the configuration of environment. The choir of Desfina, founded in 1999, consists of an adult's and a children's section.

There are two football clubs in Desfina: Isaias Desfina, founded in 1973, and Doxa Desfina, founded in 1986.

Settlements
The municipal unit of Desfina consists of the following settlements:

Agios Andreas
Agios Nikolaos
Desfina
Genimakia
Makria Mallia
Potamoi
Prosakos
Stenos
Sykia
Timios Prodromos Monastery
Valtos

Notable people
Isaias of Salona, bishop and freedom fighter
Spyros Papaloukas, painter
Fathers of Lucas Papademos, economist and Prime Minister of Greece from 2011 to 2012
Giorgos Ch. Theocharis, novelist, poet and writer

Mayors of Desfina

References

External links 

Municipality of Desfina
Phokida prefecture site on Desphina 

Populated places in Phocis